James John Roosevelt, known as James I. (December 14, 1795 – April 5, 1875) was an American politician, jurist, businessman, and member of the Roosevelt family. From 1841 to 1843, he served one term in the U.S. House of Representatives.

Early life
James I, the Roman numeral was used to distinguish him from others of the same name, was born on December 14, 1795, in New York City to James Jacobus Roosevelt (1759–1840) and Maria Van Schaak (1773–1845) and baptized at the Dutch Reformed Church. He was a great-grandson of Johannes Roosevelt, the founder of the Oyster Bay branch of the Roosevelt family.  His brother Cornelius Roosevelt was the father of James A. Roosevelt, Robert Roosevelt, and Theodore Roosevelt, Sr. as well as paternal grandfather of President Theodore Roosevelt.

Roosevelt graduated from Columbia College in 1815 and was admitted to the bar in 1818, becoming a partner of Peter Augustus Jay (son of John Jay), with a practice in New York City.

Career
An active Democrat, he campaigned for Andrew Jackson for president in 1828. He was elected alderman in 1828 and 1830, was a member of the New York State Assembly in 1835 and 1840.

Congress 
Roosevelt served in the United States Congress from 1841 to 1843, but declined to seek reelection.

Later career 
Roosevelt became a justice of the New York Supreme Court in 1851, and during one term was ex officio judge of the State Court of Appeals. From 1860 to 1861, he was the 15th U.S. District Attorney for Southern New York. He studied foreign law in the courts of England, the Netherlands, and France.

In business, Roosevelt followed in the tradition of his father as a hardware merchant. He engaged in farming after retiring. He was the first president of Roosevelt Hospital, which was founded by his cousin James H. Roosevelt.

Personal life
On May 30, 1831, Roosevelt married Cornelia Van Ness (1810–1876) in Paris, the daughter of Governor of Vermont and the Collector of the Port of New York Cornelius P. Van Ness and Rhoda (née Savage) Van Ness, and the niece of William P. Van Ness and John Peter Van Ness. The American Revolution war hero, the Marquis de Lafayette, was among their guests.  Among Cornelia's siblings were Marcia Van Ness (wife of British diplomat William Gore Ouseley) and James Van Ness,  the Mayor of San Francisco.  James and Cornelia were the parents of eleven children, all but three of whom died in childhood or early adulthood. Their children were:

 Mary Roosevelt (1832–1841), who died young.
 Cornelia Roosevelt (1833–1838), who died young.
 James Nicholas Roosevelt (1836–1856).
 John Van Ness Roosevelt (1838–1841), who died young.
 William Ouseley Roosevelt (1839–1841), who died young.
 Augustus Jay Roosevelt (1841–1842), who died young.
Van Ness Roosevelt (1843-1872)
 Charles Yates Roosevelt (1846–1883), who married Cornelia (née Livingston) Talbot, a granddaughter of Robert Livingston (the 3rd Lord of Livingston Manor), and widow of James S. Talbot.
 Marcia Ouseley Roosevelt (1847–1906), who married Edward Brooks Scovel, an opera singer, in 1877. They were the parents of Frederick Roosevelt Scovel who married Vivien May Sartoris (1879–1933), a granddaugther of U,S President Ulyess S. Grant.
 Frederick Roosevelt (1850–1916), who married Mary Loney (1850–1936).
 Matilda Roosevelt (1851–1854), who died young.

Roosevelt died on April 5, 1875, at his home, 836-838 Broadway in New York City, following complications sustained after he broke his thigh bone in a fall.  He was buried in Greenwood Cemetery in Brooklyn, New York.  Cornelia Roosevelt died in Paris on February 14, 1876.

Descendants
His granddaughter, Cornelia Roosevelt, through his son Charles Yates Roosevelt, married Baron Clemens von Zedlitz of Prussia in 1889, who drowned in a collision with the German emperor's yacht in 1901. His daughter-in-law's nephew, David Bruce-Brown (1887–1912), was in the inaugural running of the Indianapolis 500 in 1911.

References
Notes

Sources

External links 
 

1795 births
1875 deaths
Politicians from New York City
Reformed Church in America members
American people of Dutch descent
Schuyler family
James
Hardware merchants
American businesspeople
Columbia College (New York) alumni
Burials at Green-Wood Cemetery
Democratic Party members of the United States House of Representatives from New York (state)
19th-century American politicians
Presidents of the Saint Nicholas Society of the City of New York